Peter Mark Andrew Phillips (born 15 November 1977) is a British businessman and the son of Anne, Princess Royal, and Captain Mark Phillips. He is the eldest grandson of Queen Elizabeth II, a nephew of King Charles III, and 17th in the line of succession to the British throne.

Phillips attended the University of Exeter before working at Jaguar Racing. He is currently working as a managing director for SEL UK, a boutique sports management company. He married Autumn Kelly, a Canadian management consultant, in 2008 in St George's Chapel at Windsor Castle. They have two children together, separated in 2019, and divorced in 2021.

Early life and education

Peter Phillips was born at 10:46 am on 15 November 1977, in the Lindo Wing of St Mary's Hospital, London. He was the first child of Princess Anne and Mark Phillips, who had married in 1973. At the time of his birth, there was a 41-gun salute from the Tower of London. He was christened on 22 December 1977 by the Archbishop of Canterbury Donald Coggan in the Music Room of Buckingham Palace. His godparents are his maternal uncle, King Charles III; Geoffrey Tiarks; Captain Hamish Lochore; Lady Cecil Cameron of Lochiel and Jane Holderness-Roddam.

Phillips was fifth in line to the throne at birth and remained so until the birth of his cousin Prince William in 1982. His parents were said to have refused offers from his grandmother Queen Elizabeth II that would have led to his being born in the peerage. Phillips was the first legitimate grandchild of a monarch in more than 500 years to be born without a title or courtesy title. Phillips has a younger sister, Zara Tindall (née Phillips; born 1981), and two younger half-sisters, Felicity Wade (née Tonkin; born 1985), the daughter of Mark Phillips and his former mistress Heather Tonkin; and Stephanie Phillips (born 1997), the daughter from his father's second marriage to Sandy Pflueger.

Phillips went to Port Regis Prep School in Shaftesbury, Dorset before following some of his family by attending Gordonstoun School in Moray, Scotland. Whilst at Gordonstoun, he was chosen to be head boy. During his gap year, he went to Sydney and worked for Sports Entertainment Limited (SEL), a company to which he would later return; he also worked for Jackie Stewart's Formula One racing team during that time.

He attended the University of Exeter and graduated with a degree in sports science. He played for the Exeter University rugby league team.

Career
After his graduation in 2000, Phillips worked for Jaguar as corporate hospitality manager and then for Williams racing team, where he was sponsorship accounts manager. He left Williams in September 2005, for a job as a manager at the Royal Bank of Scotland in Edinburgh. In March 2012, he left RBS to take on a role as managing director at SEL UK.

In August 2012, he was guest of honour at the Rugby league Challenge Cup Final between Warrington Wolves and Leeds Rhinos at Wembley.

In the year leading up to June 2016, Phillips was responsible for organising the "Patron's Lunch", in celebration of the Queen's 90th birthday. It included a parade down The Mall and a hamper picnic for 10,000 guests.

In January 2020, Phillips appeared in an advertisement for Chinese company Bright Food. In the video, he uses his status as a "British royal family member" to promote the company's milk, while surrounded by luxury.

Personal life

Phillips dated Elizabeth Lorio, a cod liver oil heiress from the United States, for two years. In 2001 they lived together for eight months. Later, he had a four-month relationship with Tara Swain, a flight attendant.

In 2003, Phillips met Autumn Kelly, a Canadian management consultant, at the Formula 1 Canadian Grand Prix in Montreal. Their engagement was announced on 28 July 2007.

Kelly, who was raised in the Catholic Church, was received into the Church of England before her marriage. If she had been Roman Catholic at the time of the marriage, Phillips would have lost his place in the line of the succession to the throne because of since-repealed terms of the Act of Settlement 1701. Shortly before their wedding, the couple were interviewed and photographed by Hello! magazine, and were reported to have been paid £500,000, resulting in some concern in royal circles. They married on 17 May 2008 at St George's Chapel in Windsor Castle. The service was conducted by David Conner, the Dean of Windsor.
The couple lived in Hong Kong after Phillips changed positions within the Royal Bank of Scotland and became head of their sponsorships activities in the region.

Their first child, and the Queen's first great-grandchild, a daughter named Savannah Anne Kathleen, was born on 29 December 2010 at Gloucestershire Royal Hospital. The Queen was present for the baby's baptism, which took place on 23 April 2011 at Church of the Holy Cross in Avening, Gloucestershire, near Gatcombe Park, the home of Phillips' mother. Savannah is 18th in line to the throne. On 29 March 2012, the couple's second daughter, Isla Elizabeth, was born at Gloucestershire Royal Hospital. She is 19th in line to the throne.

On 11 February 2020, Phillips and his wife confirmed that they had separated in 2019 and announced they were planning to divorce. The divorce was settled on 14 June 2021.

In March 2021, Phillips was questioned by the police for travelling by car from Gloucestershire to Aberdeenshire to see a friend, despite restrictions on movement during the COVID-19 pandemic in the United Kingdom. The trip was found by the police to be not in violation of any COVID-19 lockdown rules and a spokesperson for Phillips said he was "on a business trip in relation to a company called XL Medical".

After his divorce, Phillips began a relationship with Lindsay Wallace, with whom he made his official debut as a couple at the Epsom Derby in June 2022.

On 17 September 2022, during the period of official mourning for Queen Elizabeth II, Phillips joined his sister and six cousins to mount a 15-minute vigil around the coffin of the Queen as it lay in state at Westminster Hall. On 19 September 2022, he joined the Queen's children and other senior members of the Royal Family in walking behind the cortege in the state funeral procession.

Honours
 6 February 2002: Queen Elizabeth II Golden Jubilee Medal
 6 February 2012: Queen Elizabeth II Diamond Jubilee Medal
 6 February 2022: Queen Elizabeth II Platinum Jubilee Medal

Arms

References

External links

1977 births
Living people
Alumni of the University of Exeter
Anne, Princess Royal
House of Windsor
British expatriates in Hong Kong
English Anglicans
English people of Danish descent
English people of German descent
English people of Greek descent
English people of Russian descent
English people of Scottish descent
NatWest Group people
People educated at Gordonstoun
People educated at Port Regis School
People from Gloucestershire
People from Paddington
Sports scientists